Flik and Flok may refer to:
Flik and Flok, ballet in which Rita Sangalli made her 1865 debut
Flik and Flok, fictional circus act in 1928 film Laugh, Clown, Laugh
Flik and Flok, 1863 Italian club which evolved into Armida Rowing Club

See also
"Flik Flok", track on 2010 album Shits & Giggles
Flik (disambiguation)
Flok (disambiguation)